Igor Samoilenco (born April 17, 1977 in Tiraspol, Moldavian SSR) is a retired male boxer from Moldova. He twice represented his native Eastern European country at the Summer Olympics: 1996 and 2004. Samoilenco claimed a bronze medal at the 2002 European Amateur Boxing Championships in Perm, Russia. He qualified for the 2004 Summer Olympics in Athens, Greece by ending up in first place at the 3rd AIBA European 2004 Olympic Qualifying Tournament in Gothenburg, Sweden.

References
 sports-reference

1977 births
Living people
Moldovan male boxers
Boxers at the 1996 Summer Olympics
Boxers at the 2004 Summer Olympics
Olympic boxers of Moldova
People from Tiraspol
Flyweight boxers